This is a list of ambassadors to Lithuania. Note that some ambassadors are responsible for more than one country while others are directly accredited to Vilnius.

Current Ambassadors to Lithuania

See also
 Foreign relations of Lithuania
 List of diplomatic missions of Lithuania
 List of diplomatic missions in Lithuania

External links
 Foreign Representations - Diplomatic Missions
 ORDER OF PRECEDENCE

References

Lithuania